TechKnow is a 30-minute news program on the Al Jazeera English and, formerly, Al Jazeera America networks. The show ran from April 2014 until December 2017, profiling advances and inventions in the areas of science, technology and medicine. The series was hosted by an ensemble, notably led by science communicators Phil Torres, Shini Somara, Cara Santa Maria. The show was created by executive producers Steve Lange and Roland Woerner of the Los Angeles-based  Make Fresh Productions.

The show's main setting is Republic Of Pie in North Hollywood, California.

External links
 Techknow minisite on Al Jazeera English site

2013 American television series debuts
2010s American television news shows
2020s American television news shows
Science education television series
Al Jazeera America original programming
Al Jazeera English original programming